Jānis Bērziņš or Yan Berzin may refer to:

Jānis Bērziņš (politician) (1889–1938), Soviet military official and politician
Jānis Bērziņš (diplomat) (1881–1938), Soviet diplomat
Jānis Bērziņš (basketball) (born 1993), Latvian basketball player
Jānis Bērziņš (biathlete) (born 1984), Latvian Olympic biathlete